Disturb N Tha Peace is the third album by emcee Professor Griff. The album was released on November 17, 1992, and was his final album released on Luke Records. Production was handled by Professor Griff, Luke Skyywalker, Kavon Shah, DJ Spider, DJ Toomp, Tone Control, Snake Eyez, and Society. The album did not make it on any of the Billboard album charts. Two singles were released, "Blackdraft" and "Sista, Sista," but neither charted.

Track listing
 "The Least We Forget" - 0:56 
 "Blackdraft" (Marcus Effinger, Richard Griffin, Anthony Mills, Simonian) - 5:10 
 "Sense or Shit"- 0:20 
 "Color Confrontation" (Effinger, Mills) - 2:40 
 "Disturb N tha Peace" - 3:39 
 "2-Mintute War...Ning" - 2:00 
 "7 Wattz of Reality" - 3:42 
 "Respect tha Art-Kill-Tech" (Sean Devore, Griffin) - 4:20 
 "KKK-Vs-Doo Doo Brown" - 0:20 
 "God Bless AmeriKKKa" (Devore, Griffin) - 3:02 
 "Phuck the Media" (Effinger, Griffin) - 3:58 
 "Ti'ant No Bitch - 0:15 
 "Sista, Sista" (Effinger, Griffin, Mills, Simonian) - 5:39 
 "Pre-Game Activity" (Griffin) - 1:00
 "Rebelz Against the Develz" (Effinger, Griffin, Mills, Simonian) - 3:24 
 "43rd Negative Confession" (Shah) - 3:00 
 "Wlad" - 0:32 
 "107. Point Live" (At the Slave Theater) (Devore, Effinger, Griffin, Marcelin, Marcelin, Anthony Mills, Nixon) - 5:28 
 "Blax Thank, Pt. 3" - 1:52

Personnel 

Niam Akbar – editing
Luther Campbell – executive producer
Dante Carfagna – producer
Steve Cokely – editing
Sean Devore – backing vocals
DJ Spider – scratching
DJ Toomp – scratching
Cindy Doucett – backing vocals
Cindy Douchett – backing vocals
Louis Farrakhan – editing
Keisha Gantt – backing vocals
Richard Griffin – supervisor
Charles Harrison – guitar, Bass, keyboards, vocals, backing vocals
Christopher Harrison – guitar, bass, rhythm guitar, saxophone, vocals, backing vocals
Ashra Kwesi – editing
Jack "DJ Spider" Lalane – scratching
Lord Jamar – voices
Mike "Fresh" McCray – scratching
M.G.T. – editing
Eddie Miller – drums, engineer, mixing
Milton Mizell – design
Mike Mosby – editing
Dr. Khallid Abdul Muhammad – editing
Professor Griff – producer, compilation, mixing, concept, cover art concept
Kavon Shah – producer
Society – vocals, backing vocals, producer, compilation, mixing, cover art concept, illustrations
Taqiyyah – editing
Tone Control – scratching, producer
Claudia Verela – backing vocals
Dr. Frances Crews Weisings – editing
Dramos Wilson – editing
Harold Synclair "Snake Eyez" Wright – producer 

1992 albums
Albums produced by DJ Toomp
Professor Griff albums